Amphol Lumpoon (born July 20, 1963) is a Thai actor. He is also the lead singer in the Thai rock band, Micro, but then split up for his solo career.  He was popular in the 1980s and 1990s.  Amphol was married to singer-actress Marsha Wattanapanich. They divorced in 1997. They have one child together.

Music career 
Amphol's songs (solo, and with Micro) include "Jai Sohm Sohm" ("Broken Heart"), "Ow Pai Loey" ("Take It"), "Bauk Mah Kum Diow" ("Tell Me One Thing") and "Sia Mai" ("Broken"). A compilation album featuring new Thai rock bands such as Clash, Zeal and Kala called Little Rock Project features songs by Amphol and Micro being covered by various artists.

Discography
-Micro-
Rock Lek Lek (Little Bit of Rock, 1986)
Meun Fha Rain Hi (10,000 Fahrenheit, 1988)
Dtem Tung (Fill the Tank, 1989)
-Amphol-
Danger (Wutoo Wai Fai, 1992)
Iron Horse (Mahlhek, 1993)
I.D. Card (Phol Meung Dee, 1995)
-Micro (2000s)-
Micro: Rock In Love/Rock In Rock (The Best Selected (GMM' Grammy Compilation), 2002)Micro: The Final Collection 1/2 (Micro's band and Amphol's solo songs, 2003)Tum Narn Meu Kwa: Micro: Put the right hand in the right concert (CD Audio/VCD/DVD Concert, 2004)Micro: Songs by Nitipong Hornak (2007)Micro: The Long Play Collection (2008-2009)Rock Lek Lek10,000 FahrenheitWutoo Wai FaiMicro: The 25 Years Hit Collection (2010)Sek Loso: PLUS (Features Big Ass (band), Bodyslam (Thai rock band), and Sek Loso. With live performances from the 25 Years Rock Lek Lek RETURNs concert in karaoke.)

ConcertographyRock Lek Lek Concert, 1987Amphol and Micro Concert: Ow Micro Pai Loey(อำพล ลำพูน กับ วงไมโคร คอนเสิร์ตเอาไมโครไปเลย), 1988Micro: Full Tank (Tem Tung), 1989Meu Kwa Sa-muk-kee, 1990Amphol Concert: Kon Wai Fai, 1993Amphol Concert: Asawin Mahlhek, 1995Amphol Concert: Gub Kon Wai Jai; Taun Ow Ga Kow Noi, 1995Amphol: Big Story Concert 1986-1996, 1997Tum Narn Meu Kwa: Micro: Put the right hand in the right concert, 2003Micro/Nuvo: ONE BIG SHOW, 2004Amphol Meung Dee Gub Billy Khem (Concert with Billy Ogan), 2005H.M. Blues, 2006Rewut Putinun: Remember in Tribute Concert, 200725 Years Nitipong Hornak, 2007Rock for the King, 2007Micro: Rock Lek Lek RETURNs, 2010 (Special Guests, Billy Ogan, Sek Loso, Big Ass, Mai Charoenpura)

 Film career
Amphol had the title role in The Story of Nam Pu, directed by Euthana Mukdasanit, which was submitted by Thailand for Academy Award for Best Foreign Language Film. Amphol won the best actor award at the Asia Pacific Film Festival for Nam Pu, an award he shared with Chow Yun-fat for Hong Kong 1941. Amphol was also awarded best actor for Ang Yee - Dragon's Son at the 2000 Thailand National Film Association Awards.

Filmography
 The Story of Nampoo (1984)Raeng Heung (1986) Thai TV DramaSeua jone phan seua (Crime Kings, 1998)Ang Yee - Dragon's Son (2000)The Legend of Suriyothai (2001)Bangkok Robbery'' (2004)

References

External links

Living people
1963 births
Amphol Lumpoon
Amphol Lumpoon
Amphol Lumpoon
Amphol Lumpoon
Amphol Lumpoon
Amphol Lumpoon